Saint Paul's Tower and Chapel are a defensive tower and chapel in Delimara, Marsaxlokk, Malta. The tower is also referred to as Ta' Bettina Tower  and in official documents as Delimara Tower. A tower and chapel already existed in 1776, when Claudio Muscati Xiberras was granted the title Marchese di Xrob il-Għaġin.

Tower 
The tower consists of three rooms at ground floor level used for residential purposes. The rooms have a high ceiling and are very well kept. The living area is part of the tower and has arched ceilings with typical Maltese stone-slabs (Maltese: kileb). The two-storey L-shaped tower has a plain external appearance, while the lower part has a slight slope. There is a plain projecting string course between the ground and first floor, while the first floor has a ‘dashed’ plain projecting cornice. The tower has small window openings and machicolations (Maltese: gallarija tal-misħun) for throwing projectiles or boiling liquid onto besiegers.

St Paul's Tower was included in the Antiquities Protection List of 1932 and was scheduled by the authorities as a Grade 1 national monument as per Government Notice number 1082/09.

Chapel 

The current chapel was built in 1740 by Elisabetta Muscat Cassia Dorell, and rebuilt in 1831 by her daughter Marchioness Angelica Moscati Cassia Dorell. It was restored in 1931 by Angelo Muscat Cassia Dorell.

Notes

References

Demolished buildings and structures in Malta
Marsaxlokk
Chapels in Malta
Fortified towers in Malta
Limestone churches in Malta
Churches completed in 1740